Horizonte Futebol Clube, commonly known as Horizonte, is a Brazilian football men's and women's team based in Horizonte, Ceará state. The men's team competed in the Série C and in the Copa do Brasil once, while the women's team competed in the Copa do Brasil de Futebol Feminino once.

History

Foundation
The club was founded on March 27, 2004.

Men's team
Horizonte won the Campeonato Cearense Second Division in 2007. They competed in the Série C in 2008, when they were eliminated in the First Stage of the competition. Horizonte will compete in the Copa do Brasil in 2011.

Women's team
The club competed in the Copa do Brasil de Futebol Feminino in 2007, when they were eliminated in the First Stage by Tiradentes.

Achievements

 Campeonato Cearense Second Division:
 Winners (1): 2007

Stadium
Horizonte Futebol Clube play their home games at Estádio José Domingos Neto, nicknamed Domingão. The stadium has a maximum capacity of 10,000 people.

References

Association football clubs established in 2004
Football clubs in Ceará
Women's football clubs in Brazil
2004 establishments in Brazil